Almagharibia  tv is an Algerian free-to-air television channel broadcasting from London. It was founded by a successful Algerian businessman with a number of Arab intellectuals from Britain and the Arab World.
Almagharibia  has announced the launch of a new channel in Tamazight language, "Almagharibia  two".

History
Almagharibia  was founded in November 2011, and started to broadcast its programs on 16 December 2011.

Programs
 Our religion
 World Today
 Street Echo
 Maghrebian Event
 Newspapers said

References

External links
  
 Al Magharibia – LyngSat

Arab mass media
Arabic-language television stations
24-hour television news channels in the United Kingdom
Foreign television channels broadcasting in the United Kingdom
Arabic-language television
Television channels and stations established in 2011
Television stations in Algeria